John Pekyns was an Oxford college head in the 16th-century.

Pekyns was  educated at Exeter College, Oxford, graduating B.A. in 1523 and M.A. in 1524. He was Rector from 1531 to 1534. A priest, he held the living at Bradwell juxta Mare from 1542 until his deprivation in 1554. He was also a Canon of Westminster.

References

Alumni of Exeter College, Oxford
Rectors of Exeter College, Oxford
16th-century English people
Fellows of Exeter College, Oxford
Canons of Westminster